Raihan (derived from the Arabic word Rayḥān, "Fragrance of Heaven") is a Malaysian nasheed group originally composed of five members that became popular in Malaysia with the release of their debut album Puji-Pujian in October 1996. The group's original line-up comprised Nazrey Johani, Che Amran Idris, Abu Bakar Md Yatim, Amran Ibrahim, and Azhari Ahmad as the leader. Produced by Farihin Abdul Fattah, Puji-Pujian grossed sales of more than 750,000 units in Malaysia alone, with 200,000 units sold within the first two months after its launch, and 3,500,000 units have been sold worldwide, which makes them the most successful Malaysian artist in terms of album sales.

However, on 29 August 2001, one of the founding members, Azhari Ahmad, died of a myocardial infarction (heart attack) shortly after attending the Era Awards ceremony in Genting Highlands, Pahang.

The remaining four members, Nazrey Johani, Che Amran Idris, Abu Bakar Md Yatim, and Amran Ibrahim, have continued releasing albums. So far, Raihan has released a total of 11 albums and has won many awards in Malaysia. Raihan has won AIM Anugerah Kembara three times for their extensive international tours.

Nazrey Johani resigned from Raihan and was replaced by Nordin Jaafar. However, in early January 2007, Nordin Jaafar himself resigned. Zulfadhli also is no longer with Raihan since November 2015.

Raihan's motto is 'Pray Hard, Work Smart'.

Achievements

International performances
In 1997, they were invited by Queen Elizabeth II to perform at Commonwealth Heads of Government Meeting in Edinburgh where they also received an honorary letter from Prince Charles for their performance in Commonwealth in Concert. The following year, they were given the chance to meet the Queen during her visit to Malaysia for the 1998 Commonwealth Games in Kuala Lumpur. The group had recorded 2 songs (Seal of The Prophet and God Is The Light) with Yusuf Islam in their second album Syukur.

Platinum status
Raihan is one of the most successful artists in Malaysia, where their debut album, Puji-Pujian is the highest selling album in Malaysia with a total sale of 3,500,000 units thus gaining 12 times Platinum status and Double Platinum in Singapore. Their albums were also well received by fans in neighboring Indonesia, where their fourth album, Koleksi Nasyid Terbaik sold more than 200,000 units and their tenth album, Bacalah sold more than 70,000 units.

World tour
Raihan is the third Malaysian artist to perform at the Royal Albert Hall after Siti Nurhaliza and late Sudirman Arshad, and the first artist to perform for the second time (in 2008) for Evening of Inspiration for Islamic Relief UK, where they also have launched their twelfth album, Selawat for the celebration of Mawlid in the very same hall. In 2004, they had a large tour in France covering seven cities: Bordeaux, Marseille, Nantes, Strasbourg, Lille, Lyon and Paris. They also had done a road tour in United Kingdom in cities including Glasgow, Edinburgh, Manchester, Birmingham, Cardiff, Bristol and Wembley. On 16 July 2005, they have been invited to perform at Canada's Wonderland in Toronto to entertain Muslim visitors. So far they have performed in: Australia, Canada, China, France, Great Britain, Hong Kong, Indonesia, Ireland, Kuwait, Russia, Singapore, Saudi Arabia, South Africa, Thailand, Trinidad and Tobago and United States. By 2005, they have performed concerts in Indonesia more than ten times, Thailand six times, United Kingdom four times and South Africa three times.

International tours
 Singapore Indoor Stadium (Debut Live Concert)
 Commonwealth Conference in Edinburgh (1997)
 Royal Albert Hall London, Manchester, Glasgow, Birmingham and Bristol (UK)
 Cape Town, Durban and Johannesburg (South Africa)
 Brunei Darussalam
 Moscow, Saratov and Mahachkala, Russia
 Trinidad and Tobago, South America
 Toronto, Canada
 Aceh, Medan, Padang, Palembang, Riau, Batam, Bandung, Jakarta, Solo, Jogjakarta, Surabaya, Balikpapan, Gorontalo, Fakfak, Irian Jaya (Indonesia)
 Bangkok, Patani, Narathiwat, Yala, Satun, Thailand
 Kuwait City
 Dubai, Abu Dhabi, UAE.
 Damascus, Syria
 Algiers, Constantine, Algeria
 Hong Kong
 Paris, Bordeaux, Marseille, Nantes, Lille, Strasbourg, France
 Perth, Brisbane, Melbourne, Sydney, Australia

Awards

Anugerah Industri Muzik Malaysia (Music Industry Awards)
 Best New Group (1998)
 Best Nasyid Album (Puji-Pujian) (1998)
 Best Album (Puji-Pujian) (1998)
 Kembara (Explorer) Award (1998)
 Best Duo/Group Vocal Performance in an Album (Syukur) (1999)
 Best Nasyid Album (Syukur) (1999)
 Best Duo/Group Vocal Performance in an Album (Senyum) (2000)
 Best Nasyid Album (Senyum) (2000)
 Kembara (Explorer) Award (2001)
 Best Duo/Group Vocal Performance in an Album (Demi Masa) (2002)
 Best Nasyid Album (Gema Alam) (2004)
 Best Duo/Group Vocal Performance in an Album (Allahu) (2005)
 Best Nasyid Album (Allahu) (2005)
 Best Nasyid Album (Ameen) (2006)
 Kembara (Explorer) Award (2006)
 Best Nasyid Album (Tawakkal) (2007)
 Best Nasyid Song 2009
 Malaysia's best selling album ever (PUJI-PUJIAN – 1.5Mil units) and total album sales of 3.5 million units (to date);
 Starred in Malaysia's first movie with a totally Islamic theme, SYUKUR 21;
 Won many local industry music awards for a variety of achievements including Best Album, Best Vocals, Album of the Year and Most Travelled Artistes, travelled in all six continents;
 Accorded the Malaysian Book of Records' Fastest Selling Album (Jan 1997)
 Awarded the Mahabbah award in Dubai (2006)
 Defined the Contemporary Nasyeed music genre, becoming the trendsetters and inspiring many local and international nasyeed acts
 Being the preferred benchmark for nasyeed repertoire and performances
 Appointed Peace Ambassadors representing Malaysia by the Prime Minister's Department (2006);
 Launching the annual RAIHAN World Tours (2006) and most significant of all (but seldom mentioned) – inspiring millions of lives to constantly become better Muslims.
 Listed in 50 faces of Malaysia 2008
 Listed in The 500 Most Influential Muslims in the World 2008, 2009, 2010

Albums

 01. Puji-Pujian (1996)
 02. Syukur (1997)
 03. Senyum (1999)
 04. Maafkan [with NowSeeHeart, Ajai, Rem, Amir and Man Bai] (1999)
 05. Koleksi Nasyid Terbaik (compilation) (2000)
 06. Syukur 21 [Syukur 21 film soundtrack] (2000)
 07. Demi Masa (2001)
 08. Gema Alam (2002)
 09. Brotherhood (2003) [International Release]
 10. Allahu (2004)
 11. Ameen (2005)
 12. Iqra'-Bacalah [Koleksi Terbaik Raihan 1 Dekad] (2005)
 13. Tawakal (2006)
 14. The Spirit Of Shalawat (2008)
 15. Musafir Perjuangan (2010)
 16. Zikir Teraphy (2011)
 17. Lagu-Lagu Hafalan (2011)

References

 – Retrieved 11 January 2007 (In Malay)
 – Retrieved 5 May 2007 (In Malay)

External links
 Preview Raihan's Hit Debut Album, 'Puji-Pujian'
 Preview Raihan's Hit Album, 'Syukur' which includes Yusuf Islam (formerly known as Cat Stevens) singing  "God is the Light"

Performers of Islamic music
Malaysian nasheed groups
Musical groups established in 1996
Warner Music Group artists